Top seed John Millman won the title, defeating Taro Daniel in the final 6–1, 6–3.

Seeds

Draw

Finals

Top half

Bottom half

References

 Main Draw
 Qualifying Draw

Kobe Challenger - Singles
2015 Singles